Michele Frangilli (born 1 May 1976) is an Italian archer.

Biography
He was born in Gallarate. He competed at the 1996 Summer Olympics in men's individual archery, finishing in 6th place and winning the bronze medal in the team event. He also competed at the 2000 Summer Olympics in men's individual archery, finishing in 10th place and winning the silver medal in the team event. In 2003 he has won the World Target Archery Championships for Recurve (Olympic) Division in New York.

Frangilli competed at the 2004 Summer Olympics in men's individual archery.  He won his first match, advancing to the round of 32.  In the second round of elimination, he was defeated by Hiroshi Yamamoto of Japan, the eventual silver medalist.  His final rank was 31st overall. Frangilli was also a member of the 7th-place Italian men's archery team at the 2004 Summer Olympics.

Frangilli scored a 10 with the last arrow to dramatically win the men's archery team gold medal final against the US at the 2012 Summer Olympics.

Frangilli has, up to now, won 11 Titles of World Champion for Recurve Bow in various disciplines, including Indoor, Target and Field Archery, so being the only one in the story of recurve archery to win World Champion titles in all the three specialties, for both individual and team.
He also co-authored in 2005 a book on Olympic archery technique, entitled The Heretic Archer, with his father and coach, Vittorio Frangilli. He is a former world number one ranked men's recurve archer.

In 2014, using his nickname "GILLO",  he has registered a new brand for archery products named "GILLO Gold Medal"

Records
 Current world record holder 25 meter 60 arrows, shot on 21 November 2001(Gallarate, ITA): 300+298=598
 Former world record holder 18 meter 60 arrows, shot on 13 January 2001(Nîmes, FRA): 597
 Current world record holder 36 arrow final round, shot on 3 March 2004(Caorle, ITA): 358
 He was also knighted by the Italian government.

Individual performance timeline

References

External links
 
 
 
 His official website
 His book webpage
  
 

1976 births
Living people
People from Gallarate
Italian male archers
Olympic archers of Italy
Archers at the 1996 Summer Olympics
Archers at the 2000 Summer Olympics
Archers at the 2004 Summer Olympics
Archers at the 2012 Summer Olympics
Olympic silver medalists for Italy
Olympic bronze medalists for Italy
Olympic medalists in archery
Olympic gold medalists for Italy
Medalists at the 2012 Summer Olympics
Archers at the 2015 European Games
European Games competitors for Italy
Medalists at the 2000 Summer Olympics
World Archery Championships medalists
Medalists at the 1996 Summer Olympics
Mediterranean Games silver medalists for Italy
Mediterranean Games bronze medalists for Italy
Competitors at the 2013 Mediterranean Games
Mediterranean Games medalists in archery
Archers of Centro Sportivo Aeronautica Militare
Competitors at the 2001 World Games
Competitors at the 2005 World Games
Competitors at the 2009 World Games
World Games gold medalists
World Games silver medalists
Sportspeople from the Province of Varese
20th-century Italian people
21st-century Italian people